René Eidams (born 8 May 1989) is a German darts player.

Career
Eidams competed in his first Professional Darts Corporation (PDC) event in January 2014, when he qualified for the German Darts Championship. He lost 6–5 in the first round to Joey Palfreyman.

Eidams qualified for the preliminary round of the 2016 PDC World Darts Championship after beating Maik Langendorf 10–8 in the final of the Bulls Superleague qualifier. He averaged just 69.25 against Thailand's Thanawat Gaweenuntawong, but beat him 2–0 in sets and then fell 2–0 down to world number one Michael van Gerwen in the first round. However, Eidams won his first leg of the match with a 122 finish on the bull and then took five of the next six legs to send the match into a deciding set. A tiebreak was required to settle it and Van Gerwen won the two legs he needed to edge out Eidams, who averaged 90.48 during the contest. He played in 2016 Q School, but one last 32 defeat was not enough to win a two-year PDC tour card.

Two last 16 finishes in the qualifiers saw Eidams enter the 2016 UK Open at the third round stage and he lost 9–3 to James Wilson. He met Van Gerwen again in the second round of the German Darts Masters, after defeating Peter Hudson 6–1, and lost 6–3. He exited the European Darts Matchplay at the same stage after being beaten 6–4 by Adrian Lewis. Eidams lost 5−3 to Kelvin Hart in the final of the 12th Challenge Tour event. The last European Tour event he reached this year was the International Darts Open and he was eliminated 6–1 by Steve West in the first round.

World Championship results

PDC
2016: First round (lost to Michael van Gerwen 2–3)

References

External links

1989 births
Living people
German darts players
Professional Darts Corporation associate players
Sportspeople from Hagen